Vikrant Shetty (born 17 October 1983) is an Indian-born cricketer who played for the United Arab Emirates national cricket team. He has played one One Day International for the United Arab Emirates.

External links 
CricketArchive
Cricinfo

1983 births
Living people
Cricketers from Bangalore
Indian emigrants to the United Arab Emirates
United Arab Emirates One Day International cricketers
United Arab Emirates Twenty20 International cricketers
Emirati cricketers
Indian expatriate sportspeople in the United Arab Emirates